Space Launch Complex 5 (SLC-5) was a launch pad at Vandenberg Space Force Base in California, United States. It was previously part of the Point Arguello Naval Air Station, during which time it was designated Launch Complex D or LC-D. Constructed in 1961, it was used by 69 Scout launch vehicles between 1962 and 1994. Satellites launched from the complex included Transit, OV3, Explorer and P35 (DMSP) spacecraft. Most of the satellites launched from SLC-5 were placed into low Earth orbits, or low medium Earth orbits.

As of 2009*, the complex is still standing, however the U.S. Air Force is considering demolishing it to salvage parts. If the complex is dismantled, there are plans to produce a Historic American Engineering Record of the site, and to preserve the tower.

SLC-5 launches 

 As of 19 July 2017, the complex appears to have been demolished, comparing 2009 to 2017 imagery in Google Earth.

References 
 

Space Launch Complex 5
Space Launch Complex 5
Space Launch Complex 5
1961 establishments in California